Edward Cornelius O'Leary (August 21, 1920 – April 2, 2002) was an American prelate of the Roman Catholic Church.  He served as bishop of the Diocese of Portland in Maine from1974 to 1988 and as auxiliary bishop of the same diocese from 1970 to 1974

Biography

Early life 
Edward O'Leary was born on August 21, 1920, in Bangor, Maine, in 1920.  He studied at Holy Cross College in Worcester, Massachusetts, obtaining his bachelor's degree. He then attended St. Paul's Seminary in Ottawa, Ontario, where he received a Licentiate of Sacred Theology.

Priesthood 
O'Leary was ordained to the priesthood for the Diocese of Portland by Bishop Joseph McCarthy on June 15, 1946. He was assigned as a curate at the Cathedral of the Immaculate Conception Parish, then served at Sacred Heart Parish in Portland and at St. Margaret's Parish in Old Orchard Beach, Maine. O'Leary was named chancellor of the diocese, and a domestic prelate by Pope John XXIII in 1959. O'Leary served as pastor of St. Charles Borromeo Parish in Brunswick, Maine from 1967 to 1971.

Auxiliary Bishop of Portland 
On November 16, 1970, O'Leary was appointed auxiliary bishop of the Diocese of Portland and Titular Bishop of Moglaena by Pope Paul VI. He received his episcopal consecration on January 25, 1971, from Bishop Peter Gerety, with Bishops Bernard Flanagan and Lawrence Graves serving as co-consecrators, at the Cathedral of the Immaculate Conception in Portland.

Bishop of Portland 
Following the promotion of Bishop Gerety to Archbishop of Newark in New Jersey in April 1974, Paul VI appointed O'Leary as the ninth bishop of the Diocese of Portland on October 16, 1974. He was installed on December 18, 1974.

During his tenure, O'Leary was forced to address the problems of an increasing population but a decline in priestly vocations. He encouraged the greater involvement of laity and women in church administration, and developed a system of parish councils. The Portland Diocese also joined the Maine Council of Churches during this time. O'Leary took frequent public stands on a number of social issues of importance to the Church, endorsing a referendum on pornography and opposing the Maine Equal Rights Amendment (which he believed would enforce taxpayer-funded abortions). He also worked to assist HIV/AIDS victims through the Church's social services program. It was also customary for O'Leary to visit all the hospitals every Christmas Day.

Death and legacy 
On September 27, 1988, Pope John Paul II accepted O'Leary's resignation as bishop of the Diocese of Portland. Edward O'Leary died in Portland on April 2, 2002 at age 81.

References

People from Bangor, Maine
Roman Catholic bishops of Portland
20th-century Roman Catholic bishops in the United States
College of the Holy Cross alumni
1920 births
2002 deaths